"I Go Crazy" is a song written, composed, and recorded by American singer-songwriter Paul Davis. It was the first single released from his 1977 album Singer of Songs: Teller of Tales, and his second-highest peaking pop hit, peaking at #7 on the Billboard chart in 1978. The song entered the Billboard US Hot 100 pop singles chart on 27 August 1977 and began slowly climbing, peaking in March and April 1978, before dropping off the chart the week after 27 May 1978.  Overall, it spent 40 weeks (nine months and one week) on the Billboard Hot 100 chart, setting what was then the record for the longest run on that chart, of consecutive weeks or not.

During the March 4, 1978 American Top 40 show, Casey Kasem said that Davis begged his studio to have the song presented to Lou Rawls, who he thought would make it a huge success. But when the studio saw how much faith he had in the chances of the song's success, it instead decided to release a lightly edited version of Davis's own studio demo version. (Rawls did release his cover version of the song two years later.)

Content
The lyrics describe the feelings of a man who has an unexpected meeting with a former girlfriend. Both have moved on from the relationship, and he had thought she was out of his life forever. Looking at her, however, rekindles his old affection and makes him "go crazy", at least inwardly. To his credit, he does not act on these feelings, though he does realize that he is not really over her.

Covers
The song has been covered by several artists, including these four whose versions were all released as singles:
Lee Greenwood, on his 1989 album If Only for One Night. Greenwood's version was issued as a single that summer for the country music market.
Will Downing, on his 1991 album A Dream Fulfilled. Downing's version was also a single.
David D also covered this song in the early nineties
Barry Manilow, on his 1996 album Summer of '78.
DHT, on their 2005 album Listen to Your Heart.
Hong Kong singer Leon Lai covered in Cantonese titled "心爱".

Chart performance

Paul Davis

Weekly charts

Year-end charts

Lee Greenwood

Will Downing

Barry Manilow

DHT featuring Edmée

References

1977 singles
1970s ballads
Paul Davis (singer) songs
Will Downing songs
Lee Greenwood songs
Barry Manilow songs
Pop ballads
Songs written by Paul Davis (singer)
Music published by MPL Music Publishing
1977 songs
Bang Records singles
Epic Records singles